Barb (Barb Audiences Limited) is a British organisation that is responsible for audience measurement in the United Kingdom. 

It was created in 1981 to replace two previous systems in which ITV ratings were compiled by JICTAR (Joint Industry Committee for Television Audience Research), while the BBC did their own audience research.

Barb is jointly owned by the BBC, ITV, Channel 4, Channel 5, Sky and the Institute of Practitioners in Advertising. It is a Joint Industry Currency (JIC). 

Barb measures and reports total viewing across all broadcast, VOD and video-sharing platforms. 

Barb data is used by:

 Broadcasters, VOD platforms and other media services to support decisions made in the making and distribution of programming.
 Advertisers and media agencies to support the planning and buying of ad campaigns and inform on brand and sales outcomes.
 UK regulators to inform how broadcasters and other media services operate in the public interest.
In February 2023, Barb changed its company name to Barb Audiences Ltd (formerly Broadcasters' Audience Research Board). The change reflects its heritage of continuous innovation and its ambition to continue extending the industry’s standard measurement across TV companies, VOD streamers and video-sharing platforms.

Methodology
Barb uses a hybrid approach to integrate people-based panel data with census-level online viewing data. 

The Barb panel is a sample of carefully-recruited households, selected by geography, demographics and TV platforms, to mirror the entire UK.

Each week, Barb interviews 1000 households in its Establishment Survey to see if the profile of the panel is current, and tweaks its data weighting accordingly so the panel reflects the UK.

Currently, Barb has approximately 5,300 homes (equating to approximately 12,000 individuals) participating in the panel. This means that with a total UK population of 67,026,292, according to the 2021 census, each Barb panel member represents over 5,000 people. 

Barb is expanding its panel to 7,000 individuals (approximately 16,000 people) from 2024.

The Barb panel provide information on who is in front of the screen and the type of people they are. This is critical for the UK TV and advertising industry to understand who has seen programmes and the number of viewers per screen.

A meter is attached to each TV set in Barb panel homes. People in these homes use a special remote control with dedicated buttons for each household member (and guests) to confirm who's watching. They press the buttons when they leave or come back into the room.

To determine what’s being watched, the TV-set meters take audio samples of the sounds on panellists' TV sets and convert these to digital fingerprints. Every night, Barb retrieves the fingerprints and matches them to a reference library of TV content.

There is also a meter attached to the WiFi router in panel homes to track viewing of subscription video-on-demand (SVOD) and video-sharing services by any member of the household on any device.

Barb also captures device-based big data whenever anyone in the UK watches a broadcaster’s video-on-demand (BVOD) service on a connected device.

Barb combines panel data and device-based data in a process called Dovetail Fusion.

Data reporting
Barb viewing data is collected overnight and published as overnight ratings at around 9.30 the following morning for use by the UK TV and advertising industry. 

Barb also reports catch-up viewing that happens up to seven or 28 days after the original broadcast, referred to as the consolidated ratings.

Recent developments
In November 2021, Barb began to report audiences for subscription video-on-demand services such as Amazon Prime Video, Disney+ and Netflix and video-sharing platforms such as TikTok, Twitch and YouTube. Disney+ and Netflix subsequently signed up to join Barb. 

In February 2023, Barb committed to expanding its measurement of audiences to include fit-for-TV content on video-sharing platforms.

Data gathering
In 2021, Barb awarded new research contracts to start in January 2024 and run until the end of 2029.

Barb appointed Kantar to install new metering technology into the Barb panel of homes. Barb also re-appointed Kantar to collect device-based census data. ABC was re-commissioned to independently audit the implementation of tagging software that generates this big-data set.

Barb appointed RSMB to deliver services that ensure its audience measurement is based on high-quality survey design and methodology. 

At the same time, Barb extended Ipsos's contract for conducting Barb's Establishment Survey. 

Barb’s services are supported by two other contracts: Dovetail Fusion data integration (conducted by Kantar) and provision of a content identification system (MetaBroadcast).

In January 2023, Barb awarded a panel expansion recruitment contract to Ipsos.

See also
 List of most watched television broadcasts in the United Kingdom
 Audience measurement
 Nielsen ratings
 RAJAR

References

External links
 

Audience measurement
Organisations based in the City of Westminster
Organizations established in 1981
Mass media rivalries
1981 establishments in the United Kingdom
Statistical organisations in the United Kingdom
Television organisations in the United Kingdom